WS-Federation Active Requestor Profile is a Web Services specification - intended to work with the WS-Federation specification - which defines how identity, authentication and authorization mechanisms work across trust realms.  The specification deals specifically with how applications, such as SOAP-enabled applications, make requests using these mechanisms.  By way of contrast, WS-Federation Passive Requestor Profile deals with "passive requestors" such as web-browsers.  WS-Federation Active Requestor Profile was created by IBM, BEA Systems, Microsoft, VeriSign, and RSA Security.

See also
 List of Web service specifications

References

External links
 WS-Federation: Active Requestor Profile specification

Security